Morristown may refer to:

Places

Canada
Morristown, Kings County, Nova Scotia
Morristown, Antigonish County, Nova Scotia

United States
Morristown, Arizona
Morristown, Indiana
Morristown station (Indiana)
Morristown, Minnesota
Morristown Township, Rice County, Minnesota
Morristown, New Jersey, in Morris County
Morristown District
Morristown Municipal Airport
Morristown National Historical Park
Morristown station
Morristown, Middlesex County, New Jersey
Morristown (town), New York
Morristown (village), New York
Morristown, Ohio
Morristown Historic District
Morristown, South Dakota
Morristown, Tennessee
Morristown Regional Airport
Morristown, Vermont
Morristown, West Virginia

Other uses
 Morristown, Pennsylvania, a fictional city in Brockmire
USS Morristown (ID-3580), a United States Navy cargo ship 1918–1919

See also

Battle of Morristown, in Tennessee, 1864
Morice Town, a suburb of Plymouth in Devon, England
Morriston, Wales
 Morriston, Florida, U.S.